The Sherman Silver Purchase Act was a United States federal law 
enacted on July 14, 1890.

The measure did not authorize the free and unlimited coinage of silver that the Free Silver supporters wanted;  however, it increased the amount of silver the government was required to purchase on a recurrent monthly basis to 4.5 million ounces. The Sherman Silver Purchase Act had been passed in response to the growing complaints of farmers' and miners' interests. Farmers had immense debts that could not be paid off due to deflation, and they urged the government to pass the Sherman Silver Purchase Act in order to boost the economy and cause inflation, allowing them to pay their debts with cheaper dollars. Mining companies, meanwhile, had extracted vast quantities of silver from western mines; the resulting oversupply drove down the price of their product, often to below the point at which the silver could be profitably extracted. They hoped to enlist the government to increase the demand for silver.
 
Originally, the bill was simply known as the Silver Purchase Act of 1890. Only after the bill was signed into law did it become the "Sherman Silver Purchase Act."  Senator John Sherman, an Ohio Republican and chairman of the Senate Finance Committee, was not the author of the bill, but once both houses of Congress had passed the Act and the Act had been sent to a Senate/House conference committee to iron out differences between the Senate and House versions of the Act, Senator John Sherman was instrumental in getting the conference committee to reach agreement on a final draft of the Act.  Nonetheless, once agreement on the final version was reached in the conference committee, Sherman found that he disagreed with many sections of the act. So tepid was Sherman's support that when he was asked his opinion of the act by President Benjamin Harrison, Sherman ventured only that the bill was "safe" and would cause no harm if the President signed it.

The act was enacted in tandem with the McKinley Tariff of 1890. William McKinley, an Ohio Republican and chairman of the House Ways and Means Committee worked with John Sherman to create a package that could both pass the Senate and receive the President's approval.

Under the Act, the federal government purchased millions of ounces of silver, with issues of paper currency. It became the second-largest buyer in the world, after the British Crown in India, where the Indian rupee was backed by silver rather than gold. In addition to the  million to  million that had been required by the Bland–Allison Act of 1878, the US government was now required to purchase an additional 4.5 million ounces of silver bullion every month.  The law required the Treasury to buy the silver with a special issue of Treasury (Coin) Notes that could be redeemed for either silver or gold. The result was the substantial expansion in the volume of circulating dollars without a proportionate growth in the gold stock. The crash in the silver dollar's bullion value in the 1890s from 80 cents to approximately 50 cents increased public anxiety on their continued ability to convert silver dollars and banknotes into gold. The result was a run on the Treasury's gold stock and the onset of the Panic of 1893. President Grover Cleveland then oversaw the repeal of the act to prevent the further depletion of the government's gold reserves.

On November 1, 1895, US mints halted production of silver coins, and the government closed the Carson City Mint. Banks discouraged the use of silver dollars. In fact, the years 1893–95 had the lowest productions of Morgan dollars for the entire series, creating several scarce coins.

References

Further reading

External links
President Cleveland Message on the Repeal of the Sherman Silver Purchase Act

1890 in American law
United States federal currency legislation
People's Party (United States)
Metallism
1890 in economics